Margaret Titcomb (1891–1982) was an American librarian and writer.

Early life and education
Margaret Titcomb was born in Denver, Colorado on February 24, 1891, to Ernest and Mary Evelyn Rowbotham. Orphaned in infancy, she was adopted by the lawyer George W. Titcomb and his first wife, Helen Titcomb, both of Brooklyn, NY. Margaret grew up in Brooklyn, NY and went to school at Packer Collegiate School Institute.  She went to college at Columbia University and the University of Hawaii where she studied subjects on Natural History, Anthropology and Spanish.

Career 
After College,  Margaret became a Library Assistant at The American Museum of Natural History in 1924.  From there, she got a job working at the Bishop Museum in 1931.  While she was working at the Bishop Museum, Margaret was able to enhance the museum library by turning the museum's library cataloging system into an analytic bibliography which was published between the year 1964-1969 by G. K. Hall.

Books 
During her career, Margaret wrote several books about Hawaii.  They are The Native Use of Fish in Hawaii (1952);  The Voyage of the Flying Bird (1963); Dog and Man in the Ancient Pacific (1969); The Ancient Hawaiian's:  How They Clothed Themselves (1974) and Native Use of Marine invertebrates in Old Hawaii (1979).

References 

1891 births
1982 deaths
American librarians
American women librarians
20th-century American women